Catholic higher education includes universities, colleges, and other institutions of higher education privately run by the Catholic Church, typically by religious institutes. Those tied to the Holy See are specifically called pontifical universities.

By definition, Catholic canon law states that "A Catholic school is understood to be one which is under control of the competent ecclesiastical authority or of a public ecclesiastical juridical person, or one which in a written document is acknowledged as Catholic by the ecclesiastical authority" (Can. 803). Although some schools are deemed "Catholic" because of their identity and a great number of students enrolled are Catholics, it is also stipulated in canon law that "no school, even if it is in fact Catholic, may bear the title 'Catholic school' except by the consent of the competent ecclesiastical authority" (Can. 803 §3).

The Dominican Order was "the first order instituted by the Church with an academic mission", founding  in every convent of the order, and studia generalia at the early European universities such as the University of Bologna and the University of Paris. In Europe, most universities with medieval history were founded as Catholic. Many of them were rescinded to government authorities in the Modern era. Some, however, remained Catholic, while new ones were established alongside the public ones. The Catholic Church is still the largest non-governmental provider of higher education in the world. Many of them are still internationally competitive. According to the census of the Vatican's Congregation for Catholic Education, the total number of Catholic universities and higher education institutions around the world is 1,358. On the other hand, the United States Conference of Catholic Bishops counts it at 1,861. The Catholic religious order with the highest number of universities around the world today is the Society of Jesus with 114.

Like other private schools, Catholic universities and colleges are generally nondenominational, in that they accept anyone regardless of religious affiliation, nationality, ethnicity, or civil status, provided the admission or enrollment requirements and legal documents are submitted, and rules and regulations are obeyed for a fruitful life on campus. However, non-Catholics, whether Christian or not, may or may not participate in otherwise required campus activities, particularly those of a religious nature.

Partial list of universities

To prevent repetition, for Ecclesiastical universities and faculties, see Ecclesiastical university, and for Pontifical universities, see Pontifical university.

Albania
Catholic University "Our Lady of Good Counsel", Tirana

Angola
Catholic University of Angola, Luanda

Argentina
Austral University, Buenos Aires
Catholic University of Santiago del Estero, Santiago del Estero
Facultades de Filosofía y Teología de San Miguel, San Miguel
Pontifical Catholic University of Argentina, Buenos Aires
Saint Thomas Aquinas University of the North, San Miguel de Tucumán
Universidad Católica de Córdoba, Cordoba
Universidad Católica de Cuyo, San Juan
Universidad Católica de La Plata, La Plata
Universidad Católica de Salta, Salta
Universidad Católica de Santa Fe, Santa Fe 
Universidad del Salvador, Buenos Aires
Universidad FASTA, Mar del Plata

Australia
Australian Catholic University, 7 campuses (nationwide including Sydney)
Campion College, Toongabbie, near Sydney
Catholic Institute of Sydney, Strathfield
University of Notre Dame Australia, campuses in Fremantle, Sydney, and Broome

Austria
Benedict XVI Philosophical-Theological University, Heiligenkreuz
Catholic Private University Linz, Linz
Catholic University College of Education Graz, Graz; f.2007 
International Theological Institute, Trumau (near Wien)
Pázmáneum, Wien
Private University College of Education of the Diocese of Linz, Linz; f.1968
University College of Teacher Education Edith Stein, Innsbruck
University of Innsbruck Faculty of Catholic Theology, Innsbruck
University of Salzburg Faculty of Catholic Theology, Salzburg
University of Vienna Faculty of Catholic Theology, Wien

Bangladesh
Notre Dame University Bangladesh, Dhaka

Belgium
Artevelde University of Applied Sciences, Ghent
ICHEC Brussels Management School (Institut catholique des hautes études commerciales), Woluwe-Saint-Pierre 
Institut des hautes etudes des communications sociales (IHECS), Brussels
Institut libre Marie Haps (ILMH), Ixelles
Institut Saint-Luc, Saint-Gilles
Karel de Grote University of Applied Sciences and Arts, Antwerp
LUCA School of Arts, Brussels
Saint Ignatius University Centre, Antwerp (UCSIA), Antwerp
Saint-Louis University, Brussels, (Université Saint-Louis - Bruxelles), Brussels
St John Berchmans University College, Heverlee, Heverlee
University of Leuven (Katholieke Universiteit Leuven, KU Leuven), Leuven
Kulak (Katholieke Universiteit Leuven associatie Kortrijk), Kortrijk
University of Louvain (Université catholique de Louvain, UC Louvain), Louvain-la-Neuve
UCLouvain FUCaM Mons (Facultés universitaires catholiques de Mons), Mons
University of Namur (Université de Namur, UNamur), Namur

Belize
St. John's College, Belize, Belize City

Benin
Université Catholique de l'Afrique de l'Ouest - Unité universitaire à Cotonou

Bolivia
Luis Espinal Higher Institute of Philosophy and Humanities, Cochabamba
Unidad Académica Campesina-Carmen Pampa, Carmen Pampa; a satellite campus of the Catholic University of Bolivia
Universidad Católica Boliviana, La Paz
Universidad Católica Boliviana Cochabamba; Unidad Académica Regional Cochabamba
Universidad Católica Boliviana Santa Cruz; Unidad Académica Regional Santa Cruz
Universidad Católica Boliviana Tarija; Unidad Académica Regional Tarija
Universidad La Salle Bolivia, La Paz
Universidad Loyola de Bolivia, La Paz
Universidad Salesiana de Bolivia, La Paz
University of San Francisco Xavier, Sucre

Brazil
Católica de Vitória Centro Universitário, Vitória, ES
Centro Universitário Católica de Santa Catarina, Jaraguá do Sul, SC
Centro Universitário Católico do Sudoeste do Paraná, Palmas, PR
Centro Universitário da FEI, São Bernardo do Campo, SP
Centro Universitário Franciscano, Santa Maria, RS
Centro Universitário São Camilo, Ipiranga, SP
Faculdade Católica do Tocantins, Palmas, TO 
Faculdade La Salle, Manaus, AM
Institutos Supereriores de Ensino La Salle, Niteroi, RJ
La Salle College of Lucas do Rio Verde, Lucas do Rio Verde, MT
Pontifical Catholic University of Campinas, Campinas
Pontifical Catholic University of Goiás, Goiânia
Pontifical Catholic University of Minas Gerais, Belo Horizonte
Pontifical Catholic University of São Paulo, São Paulo
Pontifical Catholic University of Paraná, Curitiba
Pontifical Catholic University of Rio de Janeiro, Rio de Janeiro
Pontifical Catholic University of Rio Grande do Sul, Porto Alegre
Universidade Católica de Brasília, Brasília, DF
Universidade Católica de Pelotas, Pelotas, RS
Universidade Católica de Pernambuco, Recife, PE
Universidade Católica de Petrópolis, Petropolis, RJ
Universidade Católica de Santos, Santos, SP
Universidade Católica do Salvador, Salvador, BA
Universidade Católica Dom Bosco, Campo Grande, MS
Universidade da Amazônia, Belem, PA
Universidade do Sagrado Coração, Bauru, SP
Universidade do Vale do Rio dos Sinos, São Leopoldo, RS
Universidade La Salle, Canoas, RS
Universidade Santa Úrsula, Rio de Janeiro, RJ
Universidade São Francisco, Bragança Paulista, SP
University of Vale do Paraíba, São José dos Campos, SP

Burkina Faso
Université Catholique de l'Afrique de l'Ouest - Unité Universitaire de Bobo-Dioulasso, Bobo-Dioulasso
Université Saint Thomas d'Aquin (USTA), Ouagadougou

Burundi
Olivia University Bujumbura, Bujumbura

Cambodia
Saint Paul Institute (SPI), Tram Kak District

Cameroon
Catholic University Institute of Buea, Buea
Catholic University of Cameroon, Bamenda
Catholic University of Central Africa, Yaoundé
Saint Monica University, Buea

Canada
Public universities that continue to claim Catholic affiliation
Mount Saint Vincent University, Halifax, Nova Scotia
Saint Mary's University, Halifax, Nova Scotia
St. Francis Xavier University, Antigonish, Nova Scotia
St. Thomas University, Fredericton, New Brunswick
Université de Montréal, Montreal, Quebec
Université de Sherbrooke, Sherbrooke, Quebec
Université Laval, Quebec City, Quebec
Université Sainte-Anne, Pointe-de-l'Église, Nova Scotia

Catholic institutions affiliated or federated to public universities
Assumption University, Windsor, Ontario (University of Windsor)
Brescia University College, London, Ontario (University of Western Ontario)
Campion College, Regina, Saskatchewan (University of Regina)
Corpus Christi College, Vancouver, British Columbia (University of British Columbia) 
Dominican University College, Ottawa, Ontario (Carleton University)
King's University College, London, Ontario (University of Western Ontario)
Regis College, Toronto, Ontario (University of Toronto)
Saint Paul University, Ottawa, Ontario (University of Ottawa)
St. Jerome's University, Waterloo, Ontario (University of Waterloo)
St. Joseph's College, Edmonton, Alberta (University of Alberta)
St. Mark's College, Vancouver, British Columbia (University of British Columbia)
St. Michael's College, Toronto, Ontario (University of Toronto)
St. Paul's College, Fort Garry, Manitoba (University of Manitoba)
St. Thomas More College, Saskatoon, Saskatchewan (University of Saskatchewan)
Université de Saint-Boniface, Winnipeg, Manitoba (University of Manitoba)

Private Catholic universities
Catholic Pacific College, Langley, British Columbia
Our Lady Seat of Wisdom College, Barry's Bay, Ontario
St. Mary's University, Calgary, Alberta

Chile
Academy of Christian Humanism University, Santiago
Alberto Hurtado University, Santiago
Catholic University of the Holy Conception, Concepcion
Catholic University of the Maule, Talca
Catholic University of the North, Antofagasta
Pontifical Catholic University of Chile, Santiago
Pontifical Catholic University of Valparaíso, Valparaiso
Silva Henríquez Catholic University, Santiago
Temuco Catholic University, Temuco
Universidad Finis Terrae, Santiago
Universidad Santo Tomás, Santiago & many campuses
University of the Andes, Chile, Santiago

Colombia
Augustinian University (Uniagustiniana), Bogota
Catholic University of Colombia, Bogota
Corporación Universitaria Lasallista, Caldas
Del Rosario University, Bogota; f.1653
Fundación Universitaria Católica Lumen Gentium, Cali
La Salle University, Colombia, Bogota
Luis Amigó Catholic University, Medellin
Minuto de Dios University Corporation, Bogota
Pontifical Bolivarian University, Medellin
Pontifical Xavierian University, Bogota
Saint Martin University, Bogota
Saint Thomas Aquinas University, Bogota
Sergio Arboleda University, Bogota
Universidad Católica de Manizales, Manizales
Universidad Católica da Pereira, Pereira
Universidad Católica de Oriente, Rionegro (near Medellin)
Universidad CESMAG, San Juan de Pasto
Universidad de San Buenaventura, 4 campuses(including Bogota)
Universidad Mariana, Pasto
University of La Sabana, Chía

Congo, Democratic Republic of
Académie des Beaux-Arts, Kinshasa
Loyola University of Congo, Kinshasa 
Marist University of Congo, Kisangani
Mazenod University (Université De Mazenod), Kinshasa
Université Catholique de Bukavu, Bukavu
Université Catholique du Congo, Kinshasa
Université Catholique du Graben, Butembo
Université Catholique la Sapientia de Goma, Goma
Université de l'Assomption, Butembo
Université de l'Uélé, Isiro
Université Notre Dame du Kasayi, Kananga
University of Cardinal Malula, Kinshasa

Congo, Republic of
Higher Institute of Technology of Central Africa (IST-AC), Pointe Noire & Douala

Costa Rica
Universidad Católica de Costa Rica, San José; f.1993
Universidad de La Salle, San José; f.1994
Universidad Juan Pablo II, San José; f.1996

Croatia
Catholic Faculty of Theology, University of Zagreb, Zagreb
Catholic University of Croatia, Zagreb; f.2005
Faculty of Philosophy and Religious Sciences, Zagreb
University of Split Faculty of Catholic Theology, Split

Cuba
Universidad Católica de Santo Tomás de Villanueva, Havana

Czech Republic
Catholic Theological Faculty, Charles University in Prague, Prague
Palacký University of Olomouc Saint Cyril and Methodius Faculty of Theology, Olomouc
University of South Bohemia in České Budějovice, Faculty of Theology, České Budějovice (Budweis)

Dominican Republic
Instituto Politécnico Loyola, San Cristobal
Universidad Católica del Este, Higüey
Universidad Católica Nordestana, San Francisco de Macoris
Universidad Católica Santo Domingo, Santo Domingo
Universidad Católica Tecnológica del Cibao, La Vega
Universidad Santo Tomas de Aquino, Santo Domingo

East Timor
St. John de Britto Institute, Kasait-Ulmera

Ecuador
Politecnica Salesiana University, Cuenca
Pontificia Universidad Católica del Ecuador, Quito
Universidad Católica de Cuenca, Cuenca
Universidad Católica de Santiago de Guayaquil, Guayaquil
Universidad de Los Hemisferios, Quito
Universidad Técnica Particular de Loja (La Universidad Católica de Loja), Loja

El Salvador
Universidad Católica de El Salvador, Santa Ana
Universidad Centroamericana, San Salvador
Universidad Don Bosco, Soyapango

Ethiopia
Ethiopian Catholic University - La Salle (ECUL), Addis Ababa
Ethiopian Catholic University of St. Thomas Aquinas (ECUSTA), Addis Ababa

France
Catholic Institute of Higher Studies - ICES (Institut Catholique d'Etudes Supérieures), La Roche-sur-Yon
Catholic University of Lyon, Lyon
Catholic University of Rennes, Rennes
Catholic University of the West, Angers
Centre Sèvres, Paris; Jesuit institution
Chavagnes Studium, Chavagnes en Paillers; Anglophone Liberal Arts Centre
Collège des Bernardins (Faculté Notre-Dame), Paris
ECAM Rennes - Louis de Broglie, Bruz, near Rennes
École catholique des arts et métiers (ECAM), Lyon
École supérieure des sciences économiques et commerciales (ESSEC Business School), Cergy-Pontoise
Institut catholique d'arts et métiers (ICAM), Lille & 5 cities
Institut Catholique de Paris, Paris
Institut supérieur d'électronique de Paris, Paris
Unilasalle (Institut Polytechnique UniLaSalle), Beauvais & Rouen
Université Catholique de Lille, Lille
University of Strasbourg Faculty of Catholic Theology, Strasbourg

Georgia
Sulkhan-Saba Orbeliani University, Tbilisi

Germany
Catholic University of Applied Sciences Berlin (KHSB), Berlin
Catholic University of Applied Sciences Freiburg (KH Freiburg), Freiburg
Catholic University of Applied Sciences Mainz (KH Mainz), Mainz
Catholic University of Applied Sciences München (KSH München, München
Catholic University of Applied Sciences North Rhine-Westphalia (KatHO NW), Köln & Münster
Catholic University of Eichstätt-Ingolstadt, Eichstätt & Ingolstadt
Faculty of Roman-Catholic Theology, University of Tübingen, Tübingen
Munich University of Philosophy, München
Sankt Georgen Graduate School of Philosophy and Theology, Frankfurt
University of Freiburg Faculty of Theology, Freiburg

Ghana
Catholic Institute of Business and Technology, Accra; affiliated to the University of Ghana
Catholic University College of Ghana, Fiapre
Spiritan University College, Ejisu

Guatemala
Rafael Landívar University, Guatemala City
Universidad de San Carlos de Guatemala, Guatemala City; f.1676
Universidad del Istmo, Fraijanes
Universidad Mesoamericana, Guatemala City

Haiti
 University Notre Dame of Haiti (Université Notre Dame d'Haïti), Port-au-Prince

Honduras
Universidad Católica de Honduras, Tegucigalpa (and various campuses throughout the country)

Hong Kong
Caritas Institute of Higher Education, Hong Kong

Hungary
Apor Vilmos Catholic College, Vác
Pázmány Péter Catholic University, Budapest
Saint Ignatius Jesuit College of Excellence, Budapest

India
As of fall 2004 there are 291 catholic colleges and universities in India. Among them some are:
Amala Institute of Medical Sciences, Thrissur
Assam Don Bosco University, Guwahati
Christ University, Bangalore
De Paul Institute of Science & Technology (DIST), Angamaly
Don Bosco Institute of Technology, Mumbai, Mumbai
Father Muller Medical College, Mangalore
Jesus and Mary College, New Delhi
Jubilee Mission Medical College and Research Institute, Thrissur
Loyola College, Chennai, Chennai
Loyola-ICAM College of Engineering and Technology, Chennai
Malankara Catholic College, Mariagiri, Marthandam
Pushpagiri Medical College, Thiruvalla
St. Francis Institute of Technology, Mumbai
St. John's Medical College, Bangalore
St. Joseph University, Nagaland, Dimapur
St. Joseph's College, Bangalore, Bangalore
St. Xavier's College, Calcutta, Kolkata; f.1860
St. Xavier's College, Mumbai, Mumbai; f.1869
St. Xavier's University, Kolkata, Kolkata
Xavier Institute of Engineering, Mumbai
XIM University, Bhubaneswar

Indonesia
Atma Jaya Catholic University of Indonesia, Jakarta; 8 schools including School of Medicine
Catholic University of Saint Thomas, Medan
Catholic University Widya Karya, Malang
De La Salle Catholic University, Manado, Manado
Mechatronics Polytechnic of Sanata Dharma, Yogyakarta
Parahyangan Catholic University, Bandung
Polytechnic ATMI Surakarta, Surakarta
Sanata Dharma University, Yogyakarta
Sekolah Tinggi Filsafat Pineleng, Manado
Soegijapranata Catholic University (Unika Soegijapranata), Semarang
Universitas Atma Jaya Makassar, Makassar
Universitas Atma Jaya Yogyakarta, Yogyakarta
Widya Mandala Catholic University, Surabaya
Widya Mandira Catholic University, Kupang

Iraq
Catholic University in Erbil, Ankawa-Erbil

Ireland
All Hallows College, Dublin; Dublin City University All Hallows Campus
Catholic University of Ireland, Dublin; became National University of Ireland
Marino Institute of Education, Dublin
Mary Immaculate College, Limerick; a college of the University of Limerick
St. Patrick's, Carlow College, Carlow
St Patrick's College, Maynooth
St. Patrick's College, Thurles, now MIC St. Patrick's Thurles Campus
The Priory Institute, Tallaght; Dominican institution, validated by Technological University of Dublin

Israel
École Biblique, Jerusalem
Studium Biblicum Franciscanum, Jerusalem
Studium Theologicum Salesianum, Ratisbonne Monastery, Jerusalem
Tantur Ecumenical Institute, Jerusalem

Italy
See also Vatican
European University of Rome (UER), Roma; Legionaries of Christ
John Felice Rome Center, Roma
Libera Università Maria SS. Assunta (LUMSA), Roma
Pontifical Faculty of Theology of Sardinia, Cagliari
St. John's University (Italy), Roma; Vincentian Fathers
Studium Generale Marcianum, Venezia
Università Campus Bio-Medico, Roma; Opus Dei
Università Cattolica del Sacro Cuore, Milano & Roma
Vita-Salute San Raffaele University (Università Vita-Salute San Raffaele), Milano

Ivory Coast (Côte d'Ivoire)
Université Catholique de l'Afrique de l'Ouest, Abidjan

Jamaica
Catholic College of Mandeville, Manchester Parish
Saint Joseph's Teachers' College, Kingston

Japan
Elisabeth University of Music, Hiroshima
Fuji Women's University, Sapporo
Kagoshima Immaculate Heart University, Satsumasendai 
Kyoto Notre Dame University, Kyoto
Nagasaki Junshin Catholic University, Nagasaki
Nanzan University, Nagoya
Notre Dame Seishin University, Okayama
St. Catherine University, Matsuyama
St. Marianna University School of Medicine, Kawasaki
St. Mary's College (Japan), Kurume
St. Thomas University, Japan, Amagasaki
Seisen Jogakuin College, Nagano
Seisen University, Tokyo
Sendai Shirayuri Women's College, Sendai
Shirayuri University, Tokyo
Sophia University, Tokyo
Tenshi College, Sapporo
Tokyo Junshin University, Tokyo
University of the Sacred Heart, Tokyo

Jordan
American University of Madaba, Madaba

Kenya
Catholic University of Eastern Africa, Nairobi
Hekima University College, Nairobi; Jesuit
 Regina Pacis University College, Nairobi
St. Joseph's Medical Training College, Sondu
Strathmore University, Nairobi
 Tangaza University College, Nairobi
 Uzima University College, Kisumu

Korea
Catholic Kwandong University, Gangneung
Catholic Sangji College, Andong
Catholic University of Daegu, Daegu
Catholic University of Pusan, Pusan
Daejeon Catholic University, Sejong City
Gwangju Catholic University, Naju
Incheon Catholic University, Incheon
Catholic Kkottongnae University, Cheongju
Mokpo Catholic University, Mokpo
Sogang University, Seoul
Suwon Catholic University, Hwaseong, Gyeonggi
The Catholic University of Korea, Seoul & Bucheon

Lebanon
Antonine University, Baabda
College La Sagesse St Joseph - Ashrafieh, Beirut
Notre Dame University - Louaize, Zouk Mosbeh
Saint Joseph University, Beirut
Université La Sagesse, Furn-El-Chebak
Université Saint-Esprit de Kaslik, Kaslik
Université Sainte Famille, Batroun

Lithuania
St. Ignatius of Loyola University of Applied Sciences, Kaunas 
Vytautas Magnus University Faculty of Catholic Theology, Kaunas

Luxembourg
Sacred Heart University Luxembourg, Luxembourg City

Macau
University of Saint Joseph, Macau; formerly Macau Inter-University Institute

Madagascar
Catholic University of Madagascar, Antananarivo
Ecole Professionnelle Supérieure Agricole Bevalala, Antananarivo
Saint Michael Higher Technical Institute, Amparibe, Antananarivo
SAMIS-ESIC School of Information and Communication, Amparibe

Malawi
Catholic University of Malawi, Montfort

Malta
University of Malta Faculty of Theology, Msida

Mexico
Ateneo de Monterrey University, Monterrey
Ibero-American University of Torreón, Torreón
Ibero-American University Tijuana, Tijuana
Intercultural Institute of Ayuuk, Oaxaca
ITESO, Guadalajara; Jesuit university
La Salle University of Chihuahua, Chihuahua
Loyola University of the Pacific, Acapulco
Marist University of Querétaro, Querétaro
Montolinia del Pedregal University, Ciudad de México
Pontifical University of Mexico, Ciudad de México
Simón Bolívar University (Mexico), Ciudad de México
Tamaulipas Institute of Higher Education, Altamira
Universidad Anáhuac Cancún, Cancún
Universidad Anáhuac del Sur, Ciudad de México
Universidad Anáhuac Mayab, Mérida
Universidad Anáhuac México Norte, Huixquilucan
Universidad Anáhuac San Andrés Cholula, Puebla
Universidad Autónoma de Guadalajara, Guadalajara
Universidad Catolica Lumen Gentium, Ciudad de Mexico
Universidad de Monterrey, Monterrey
Universidad del Valle, Ciudad de México
Universidad del Valle de Atemajac, Zapopan
Universidad Iberoamericana, Ciudad de México
Universidad Iberoamericana León, León
Universidad Iberoamericana Puebla, San Andrés Cholula
Universidad Incarnate Word, Ciudad de Mexico & Irapuato
Universidad Intercontinental, Ciudad de México
Universidad La Salle, Ciudad de México & 14 campuses
Universidad Lasallista Benavente, Celaya
Universidad Panamericana, Ciudad de México
Universidad Popular Autónoma del Estado de Puebla, Puebla City
Universidad Salesiana México, Ciudad de México
Vasco de Quiroga University, Morelia

Mozambique
 Catholic University of Mozambique (Universidade Católica de Moçambique), Beira
 Holy Family Pedagogical University, Maxixe
 St. Thomas University of Mozambique, Maputo

Nepal
St. Xavier's College, Kathmandu

Netherlands
KPZ University of Applied Sciences (Katholieke Pabo Zwolle), Zwolle
Radboud University Nijmegen, Nijmegen; non ex corde
University of Tilburg, Tilburg

New Zealand
Catholic Institute of Aotearoa New Zealand, Wellington
Good Shepherd College, Auckland

Nicaragua
Catholic University of Dry Tropic Farming and Livestock, Estelí
Catholic University Redemptoris Mater, Managua
Central American University (Managua), Managua
Thomas More Universitas, Managua
Universidad La Anunciata, Rivas
Universidad Internacional Antonio de Valdivieso, Rivas
Universidad Juan Pablo II, Managua
Universidad Tecnológica La Salle, León

Nigeria
Augustine University Ilara, Epe
Caritas University, Amorji-Nike
Catholic Institute of West Africa, Port Harcourt 
Catholic University of Nigeria (Veritas University), Abuja
Dominican University Ibadan, Ibadan
Godfrey Okoye University, Enugu
Gregory University, Uturu
Madonna University, Ihiala
Our Saviour Institute of Science and Technology, Enugu
Pan-Atlantic University, Lagos

Pakistan
Notre Dame Institute of Education, Karachi
Sargodha Institute of Technology, Sargodha

Palestine
Bethlehem University, Bethlehem

Panama
Universidad Católica Santa María La Antigua, Panama City
Universidad de Cartago, David, Chiriquí

Papua New Guinea
Divine Word University, Madang

Paraguay
Higher Institute of Humanistic and Philosophical Studies, Asuncion
Universidad Católica Nuestra Señora de la Asunción, Asuncion

Peru
Antonio Ruiz de Montoya University (UARM), Lima
Catholic University Los Angeles of Chimbote, Chimbote
Catholic University of Santa María, Arequipa
Catholic University of Trujillo, Trujillo
Pontifical Catholic University of Peru, Lima
Universidad Católica de San Pablo, Arequipa
Universidad Católica Santo Toribio de Mogrovejo, Lambayeque 
Universidad Católica Sedes Sapientiae (UCSS), Lima 
Universidad de San Martín de Porres, Lima
Universidad Femenina del Sagrado Corazón, Lima
University of the Pacific, Lima
University of Piura, Piura & Lima

Philippines

There are more than 40 universities — besides many colleges — in the Philippine Catholic Church. Among these, some universities are:
Adamson University, Manila
Angeles University Foundation, Angeles City
Ateneo de Davao University, Davao City
Ateneo de Manila University, Quezon City
Ateneo de Zamboanga University, Zamboanga City
De La Salle Araneta University, Malabon
De La Salle University, Manila
De La Salle University – Dasmariñas, Cavite
Holy Angel University, Angeles City
La Salle University, Ozamiz
Saint Louis University (Philippines), Baguio City
St. Paul University Manila, Manila
St. Paul University Quezon City, Quezon City
University of Saint Louis Tuguegarao, Cagayan
University of Santo Tomas, Manila
University of Santo Tomas - Legazpi, Albay

Poland
Cardinal Stefan Wyszyński University in Warsaw, Warsaw
Jesuit University of Philosophy and Education Ignatianum, Kraków
John Paul II Catholic University of Lublin, Lublin
Pontifical Faculty of Theology in Warsaw, Warsaw
Pontifical Faculty of Theology in Wrocław, Wrocław
Pontifical University of John Paul II, Kraków
University of Opole Faculty of Theology, Opole
cf. In Poland also work faculties of theology in some public universities.

Portugal
Catholic University of Portugal, Lisbon & Porto, Braga, Viseu
Paula Frassinetti-Superior School of Education, Porto

Puerto Rico
Bayamon Central University, Bayamon
Ponce School of Medicine (Ponce Health Sciences University), Ponce 
University of the Sacred Heart, Santurce (San Juan)

Qatar
Georgetown University in Qatar, Education City

Romania
Jesuit Academy of Kolozsvár, Cluj-Napoka
Roman Catholic Theological Institute of Iaşi, Iaşi

Rwanda
Catholic University of Rwanda, Butare
Université Catholique de Kabgayi, Muhanga

Senegal
Université Catholique de l'Afrique de l'Ouest - Unité universitaire à Dakar

Sierra Leone
University of Makeni, Makeni

Singapore
LASALLE College of the Arts, Singapore

Slovakia
Catholic University in Ružomberok, Ružomberok
Roman Catholic Faculty of Theology in Bratislava, Comenius University, Bratislava
University of Trnava Faculty of Theology, Bratislava

Slovenia
Catholic Institute Faculty of Law & Business Studies (FLBS), Ljubljana
University of Ljubljana Faculty of Theology, Ljubljana

South Africa
St Augustine College of South Africa, Johannesburg

South Sudan
Catholic University of South Sudan, Juba and Wau
St. Mary's University in Juba, Juba

Spain
Abat Oliba CEU University, Barcelona
Catholic University of Ávila, Avila
CEU San Pablo University, Madrid
Chemical Institute of Sarrià, Barcelona
Comillas Pontifical University, Madrid
ESADE, Barcelona
Fernando III University, Seville
Holy Family University Center, Úbeda
IESE Business School, Barcelona
International University of Catalonia, Barcelona
Loyola University Andalusia, Córdoba and Seville
Pontifical University of Salamanca, Salamanca
Ramon Llull University, Barcelona
Real Centro Universitario Escorial-Maria Christina, San Lorenzo de El Escorial
Saint Louis University Madrid Campus, Madrid
San Damaso Ecclesiastical University, Madrid
Universidad Católica San Antonio de Murcia, Murcia
Universidad CEU Cardenal Herrera, Valencia
Universidad Francisco de Vitoria, Madrid
Universidad San Jorge, Villanueva de Gállego
University of Agricultural Engineering, Valladolid
University of Deusto, Bilbao
University of Navarra, Pamplona
Valencia Catholic University Saint Vincent Martyr, Valencia
Villanueva University, Madrid

Sri Lanka
Aquinas College of Higher Studies (Aquinas University College), Colombo
Benedict XVI Catholic Institute, Negombo

Sudan
Comboni College for Science and Technology, Khartoum

Sweden
Newman Institute, Uppsala

Switzerland
University of Fribourg, Fribourg
University of Lucerne Faculty of Theology, Luzern

Taiwan
Cardinal Tien College of Healthcare and Management, New Taipei
Fu Jen Catholic University, New Taipei
Providence University, Taichung
Saint Mary's Junior College of Medicine, Nursing and Management, Yilan
Wenzao Ursuline University of Languages, Kaohsiung

Tanzania
Catholic University of Health and Allied Sciences, Mwanza
Mwenge Catholic University, Moshi
Ruaha Catholic University, Iringa
St. Augustine University of Tanzania, Nyegezi & Malimbe
St. Francis University College of Health and Allied Sciences, Ifakara
St. Joseph University In Tanzania, Dar es Salaam

Thailand
Assumption University, Bangkok
Saint John's Group of Schools and University, Bangkok
Saint Louis College, Bangkok
St. Theresa International College, Nakhon Nayok

Togo
Université Catholique de l'Afrique de l'Ouest - Unité universitaire à Togo, Lomé

Uganda
Uganda Martyrs University, Nkozi
University of Kisubi, Kisubi
University of the Sacred Heart Gulu, Gulu

Ukraine
Superior Institute of Religious Sciences of St. Thomas Aquinas, Kyiv
Ukrainian Catholic University, Lviv

United Arab Emirates
Saint Joseph University - Dubai, Dubai

United Kingdom
Blackfriars Hall, Oxford; Permanent private hall of University of Oxford
Campion Hall, Oxford; Permanent private hall of University of Oxford
Digby Stuart College, London; constituent residential college of University of Roehampton
Heythrop College, London; former constituent college of University of London
Leeds Trinity University, Leeds
Newman College Ireland, Ballykelly
Newman University, Birmingham
St Benet's Hall, Oxford; Permanent private hall of University of Oxford
St Mary's University, Twickenham, London
St. Mary's University College, Belfast

United States

There are 244 Catholic higher education degree-granting institutions in the United States. Among the most well known are:
Ave Maria University, Ave Maria, Florida
Boston College, Chestnut Hill, Massachusetts
Catholic University of America, Washington, DC
Creighton University, Omaha, Nebraska
DePaul University, Chicago, Illinois
Duquesne University, Pittsburgh, Pennsylvania
Fordham University, New York City
Georgetown University, Washington, DC
Gonzaga University, Spokane, Washington
Loyola Marymount University, Los Angeles, CA
Loyola University Chicago, Chicago, Illinois
Marquette University, Milwaukee, Wisconsin
Saint Joseph's University, Philadelphia, Pennsylvania
Saint Louis University, St. Louis, Missouri
Saint John's University, Queens, New York
Santa Clara University, Santa Clara, California
Seton Hall University, South Orange, New Jersey
University of Dayton, Dayton, Ohio
University of Notre Dame, South Bend, Indiana
University of San Diego, San Diego, California
University of San Francisco, San Francisco, California
University of St. Thomas (Minnesota), St. Paul, Minnesota
Villanova University, Villanova, Pennsylvania
Xavier University, Cincinnati, Ohio

Uruguay
Universidad Católica del Uruguay Dámaso Antonio Larrañaga, Montevideo
Universidad de Montevideo, Montevideo

Vatican

Alphonsian Academy; Redemptorists
Institute of the Theology of the Consecrated Life Claretianum; Claretians
John Paul II Pontifical Theological Institute for Marriage and Family Sciences
Marianum; Servite Order
Patristic Institute Augustinianum; Augustinians 
Pontifical Athenaeum Regina Apostolorum; Legionaries of Christ
Pontifical Biblical Institute; Jesuits
Pontifical Institute of Arab and Islamic Studies; White Fathers
Pontifical Institute of Sacred Music 
Pontifical Oriental Institute; Jesuits
Pontifical Theological Faculty Teresianum; Carmelites
Pontificia Università Gregoriana; Jesuits
Pontificia Università Lateranense; Diocese of Rome
Pontifical University Antonianum; Franciscans
Pontifical University of the Holy Cross; Opus Dei
Pontifical University of St. Bonaventure; Conventual Franciscans
Pontifical University of St. Thomas Aquinas (Angelicum); Dominicans
Pontifical Urbaniana University; Congregation for the Evangelization of Peoples 
Pontificio Ateneo Sant Anselmo; Benedictines
Salesian Pontifical University; Salesians

Venezuela
Andrés Bello Catholic University, Caracas
Catholic University of Tachira, San Cristóbal
Jesus the Worker University Institute, Caracas
Universidad Católica Cecilio Acosta, Maracaibo
Universidad Católica Santa Rosa, Caracas
Universidad Monteávila, Caracas

Vietnam
Catholic Institute of Vietnam, Ho Chi Minh City; f.2016
Loyola University Chicago Vietnam Center, Ho Chi Minh City
Pontifical College of St. Pius X, Da Lat

Zambia
Charles Lwanga College of Education, Chisekesi
DMI St. Eugene University, Chibombo and Chipata
St. Bonaventure University College, Lusaka
Zambia Catholic University, Kalulushi

Zimbabwe
Arrupe Jesuit University, Harare 
Catholic University of Zimbabwe, Harare

Academic rankings
Some of the universities, including Katholieke Universiteit Leuven, are ranked in the top list of universities according to the Times Higher Education journal. There is so far no list of academic rankings of Catholic universities. In the United States, U.S. News & World Report magazine provides the Best Colleges ranking; University of Notre Dame, Georgetown University, and Boston College have been scored as top Catholic national universities.

See also

References